Myrmica obscurata is a species of ant of the genus Myrmica. It is found in Sri Lanka.

References

Animaldiversity.org

External links

 at antwiki.org

Myrmica
Hymenoptera of Asia